The 1935 Idaho Vandals football team represented the University of Idaho in the 1935 college football season. The Vandals were led by first-year head coach Ted Bank, and were members of the Pacific Coast Conference. Home games were played on campus in Moscow at MacLean Field, with one in Boise at Public School Field.

Idaho compiled a  overall record and lost all but one of its six games in the PCC, defeating cellar rival Montana.

In the Battle of the Palouse with neighbor Washington State, the Vandals suffered an eighth straight loss, falling  at homecoming in Moscow on November 9. Idaho's most recent win in the series was ten years earlier in 1925 and the next was nineteen years away in 1954.

Schedule

 The Little Brown Stein trophy for the Montana game debuted three years later in 1938

All-conference
No Vandals were named to the All-Coast team; tackle Bob McCue was a third team selection, and halfback Theron Ward was honorable mention.

NFL Draft
One Vandal senior was selected in the inaugural 1936 NFL Draft, which lasted nine rounds (81 selections).

List of Idaho Vandals in the NFL Draft

References

External links
Gem of the Mountains: 1936 University of Idaho yearbook – 1935 football season
Go Mighty Vandals – 1935 football season
Idaho Argonaut – student newspaper – 1935 editions

Idaho
Idaho Vandals football seasons
Idaho Vandals football